The 1958 NCAA University Division football season was notable in that it was the first to feature the two-point conversion.  On January 13, 1958, the eleven-man NCAA Rules Committee unanimously approved a resolution to allow teams to choose between kicking an extra point after a touchdown, or running or passing from the three-yard line for two points. University of Michigan athletic director Fritz Crisler said at the meeting in Fort Lauderdale, "It's a progressive step which will make football more interesting for the spectators," adding that the rule "will add drama to what has been the dullest, most stupid play in the game."

Louisiana State University (LSU), with a record of 10–0, was crowned the national champion at the end of the regular season by both major polls, and won the Sugar Bowl on New Year's Day. The Iowa Hawkeyes won the Rose Bowl by 26 points and were crowned national champions by the Football Writers Association of America in January, after the bowl games.

During the 20th century, the NCAA had no playoff for the major college football teams in the University Division, later known as Division I-A. The NCAA did recognize a national champion based upon the final results of "wire service" (AP and UPI) polls.  The extent of that recognition came in the form of acknowledgment in the annual NCAA Football Guide of the "unofficial" national champions.  The AP poll in 1958 consisted of the votes of as many as 203 sportswriters.  Though not all writers voted in every poll, each would give their opinion of the twenty best teams.  Under a point system of 20 points for first place, 19 for second, etc., the "overall" ranking was determined.  Although the rankings were based on the collective opinion of the representative sportswriters, the teams that remained "unbeaten and untied" were generally ranked higher than those that had not.  A defeat, even against a strong opponent, tended to cause a team to drop in the rankings, and a team with two or more defeats was unlikely to remain in the Top 20.  The top teams played on New Year's Day in the four major postseason bowl games: the Rose Bowl (near Los Angeles at Pasadena), the Sugar Bowl (New Orleans), the Orange Bowl (Miami), and the Cotton Bowl (Dallas).

Conference and program changes

Conference changes
Two conferences began play in 1958:
Middle Atlantic Conference – an active NCAA Division III conference
Western Pennsylvania Conference – active through the 1967 season
One conference played their final season in 1958:
Virginia Little Eight Conference – active since the 1949 season; previously known the Virginia Little Six (1949–1953) and Virginia Little Seven (1954–1955)

Membership changes

September
In the preseason poll released on September 15, 1958, the Buckeyes of Ohio State University were the first place choice for 46 of 99 writers casting votes, followed by Oklahoma, Notre Dame, Michigan State and 1957's champion, Auburn.  As the regular season progressed, a new poll would be issued on the Monday following the weekend's games.

Most teams did not begin play until September 27.  On September 13, Kentucky beat Hawaii 51–0 in a game in Louisville, and attempted the 2-point conversion, but without success.  One of the first successful 2-point conversions in an NCAA game happened when Iowa State Teachers College hosted Bradley University at Cedar Falls, Iowa on September 13. Max Huffman carried the ball over twice on conversion attempts to give the Panthers of Iowa Teachers a 29–12 win over the Braves. On September 20, No. 6 Mississippi and No. 8 Texas Christian were among the winners, beating Memphis State (17–0) and Kansas (42–0) respectively, but the Top Five schools had not yet started play. The poll for the five 0–0 teams was No. 1 Ohio State, No. 2. Oklahoma, No. 3 Auburn, No. 4 Michigan State, and No. 5 Notre Dame.

September 27 
No. 1 Ohio State narrowly beat No. 20 SMU at home, 23–20, and fell to third in the next poll.  No. 2 Oklahoma, on the other hand, rolled over visiting No. 13 West Virginia 47–14, and rose to first place. No. 3 Auburn beat Tennessee in Birmingham, 13–0, and No. 4 Michigan State beat California 32–12.  No. 5 Notre Dame beat Indiana 18–0, but fell to 7th, while No. 8 Army, which beat South Carolina 45–8, took the place of the Irish. The next poll: No. 1 Oklahoma, No. 2 Auburn, No. 3 Ohio State, No. 4 Michigan State, and No. 5 Army.

October
October 4  No. 1 Oklahoma got past visiting Oregon, 6–0, and dropped to second.  No. 2 Auburn, which beat UT-Chattanooga 30–8 at home, moved up to the top spot.  No. 3 Ohio State beat Washington at home, 12–7.  No. 4 Michigan State played No. 16 Michigan to a 12–12 tie, and fell to 9th.  No. 5 Army beat Penn State 26–0.  No. 7 Notre Dame, which beat No. 17 SMU in Dallas, 14–6, returned to the Top Five. The next poll: No. 1 Auburn, No. 2 Oklahoma, No. 3 Army, No. 4 Notre Dame, and No. 5 Ohio State.

October 11
No. 1 Auburn won at Kentucky, 8–0.  No. 2 Oklahoma sustained a 15–14 loss at Dallas in their annual meeting with the No. 16 Texas Longhorns. In South Bend, Indiana, the visiting No. 3 Army Cadets beat No. 4 Notre Dame, 14–2, and were voted No. 1 in the next poll. No. 5 Ohio State won at Illinois, 19–13. No. 6 Wisconsin, which beat Purdue 31–6, and No. 9 Michigan State, which beat No. 10 Pittsburgh 22–8, rose in the polls, to put three Big Ten schools in the top five. The next poll: No. 1 Army, No. 2 Auburn, No. 3 Ohio State, No. 4 Wisconsin, and No. 5 Michigan State.

On October 18 at West Point, New York, No. 1 Army beat Virginia 35–6.  No. 2 Auburn tied with Georgia Tech 7–7 in Atlanta and fell in the polls.  No. 3 Ohio State beat Indiana 49–8.  No. 4 Wisconsin lost to No. 13 Iowa at home, 20–9, and No. 5 Michigan State began a five-game losing streak with a 14–6 defeat at Purdue.  The Spartans would finish the season with a 3–5–1 record after starting 2–0–1.  No. 7 Texas (24–6 over Arkansas) and No. 9 LSU (32–7 over Kentucky) rose in the polls. The next poll: No. 1 Army, No. 2 Ohio State, No. 3 LSU, No. 4 Texas, and No. 5 Auburn.

October 25  For the top-ranked teams, a tie was only slightly better than a loss.  No. 1 Army played to a 14–14 tie against the Panthers at Pittsburgh, and No. 2 Ohio State tied with Wisconsin at home 7–7.  No. 3 LSU beat Florida 10–7, and the win was enough to propel the Tigers to first place.  No. 4 Texas lost to the Rice Owls in Houston, 34–7.  No. 5 Auburn beat Maryland at home, 20–7.  No. 7 Iowa, which beat Northwestern 26–20, rose to 2nd in the next poll: No. 1 LSU, No. 2 Iowa, No. 3 Army, No. 4 Auburn, and No. 5 Ohio State.

November
November 1 
No. 1 LSU beat No. 6 Ole Miss 14–0. No. 2 Iowa won at Michigan, 37–14.  No. 3 Army crushed Colgate, 68–6.  No. 4 Auburn won 6–5 at Florida.  In Columbus, No. 5 Ohio State was upset by visiting No. 11 Northwestern, 21–0. The next poll was: No. 1 LSU, No. 2 Iowa, No. 3 Army, No. 4 Northwestern, and No. 5 Auburn.

November 8  
No. 1 LSU beat Duke 50–18. No. 2 Iowa won at Minnesota 28–6.  No. 3 Army beat the No. 13 Rice Owls in Houston, 14–7. No. 4 Northwestern lost at Madison to No. 7 Wisconsin, 17–13. No. 5 Auburn beat Mississippi State 33–14 at home. The next poll was: No. 1 LSU, No. 2 Iowa, No. 3 Army, No. 4 Auburn, and No. 5 Wisconsin.

November 15 
No. 1 LSU beat Mississippi State at Jackson 7–6.  No. 2 Iowa lost at home to No. 16 Ohio State 38–28.  No. 3 Army beat Villanova 26–0.  No. 4 Auburn met the Georgia Bulldogs halfway in Columbus, Georgia, and won 21–6.  No. 5 Wisconsin won 31–12 at Illinois.  No. 6 Oklahoma, which beat Missouri 39–0, rose to 4th. The next poll was: No. 1 LSU, No. 2 Auburn, No. 3 Army, No. 4 Oklahoma, and No. 5 Wisconsin.

November 22 
In New Orleans, the No. 1 LSU Tigers crushed Tulane 62–0, scoring 56 points in the second half, to close their season 10–0–0.  They would face the Clemson Tigers in the Sugar Bowl.  Behind them were the No. 2 Auburn Tigers, who beat Wake Forest at home 21–7.  No. 3 Army was idle as it prepared for the annual Army-Navy game.  No. 4 Oklahoma crushed Nebraska 40–7.  No. 5 Wisconsin beat Minnesota to close its season at 7–1–1.  No. 6 Iowa, which beat No. 15 Notre Dame 31–21, returned to the Top Five: No. 1 LSU, No. 2 Auburn, No. 3 Oklahoma, No. 4 Iowa, and No. 5 Army.

On November 29  No. 2 Auburn defeated Alabama 14–8 in Birmingham to finish its season at 9–0–1, but they were on probation for recruiting violations and ineligible for a bowl game.  No. 3 Oklahoma won at Oklahoma State 7–0. The Sooners (who had not lost a conference game since 1946) won the Big 7 title and headed to the Orange Bowl. In Philadelphia, No. 5 Army beat Navy, 22–6, to finish its season 8–0–1.

The final AP Poll was released on December 1, and 
the No. 1 LSU Tigers, at 10–0–0, won the AP Trophy with 130 of the first place votes.  The other 73 votes were spread among 12 schools, including Rose Bowl-bound No. 2 Iowa (17), No. 3 Army (13), No. 4 Auburn (9), No. 5 Oklahoma (10), No. 6 Air Force (2), No. 7 Wisconsin (13), No. 8 Ohio State (3), and No. 9 Syracuse (1).  The United States Air Force Academy football team, nicknamed the Falcons, had a 9–0–1 record in only their second year of playing college football, and accepted a bid to face No. 10 Texas Christian in the Cotton Bowl.

Conference standings

Bowl games

Major bowls
Thursday, January 1, 1959

Other bowls

Notably, the Tangerine Bowl initially extended a bid to Buffalo. However, when the bowl organizers told the school that its two black players would not be allowed to play, the team unanimously voted to turn down the bid. The Bulls did not appear in a bowl game until a half century later in 2008.

Rankings

Heisman Trophy voting
The Heisman Trophy is given to the year's most outstanding player

Source:

See also
 1958 College Football All-America Team

References